Un Nos Ola Leuad (One Moonlit Night) is a novel written by Welsh writer Caradog Prichard. It was first published in 1961. It has been translated into English by Philip Mitchell.

Plot 

The novel is an account of childhood, and depicts a mother-son relationship, seen from the viewpoint of the son. It is set in Bethesda, Wales around the years 1915–1920, in the midst of the North Wales quarrying areas. Bethesda is only referred to as "the Village", but neighbouring places are given their real names. The novel has autobiographical echoes. Prichard wrote the novel in middle age and it was completed after his mother's death in 1954.

Inspiration 
Prichard was born in Bethesda in 1904. It was an almost entirely Welsh-speaking village and owed its existence to the slate-quarrying industry. In 1905, when Prichard was five months old his father was killed in a quarry accident. The portrait in the novel of a mother struggling to survive reflected reality just as its story of a young boy whose life is torn apart by his mother's mental illness reflected his personal history. His mother suffered a breakdown when he was in his teens and in 1923 entered a mental hospital from which she would not emerge.

Response and analysis 
Prichard's biographer, Menna Baines, has remarked upon the difference in what is made of the community as it is looked at in  Prichard's work, with how it appears in the work of Kate Roberts, and T. Rowland Hughes, also writers of the Caernarfonshire quarrying district.
 
"This community traditionally portrayed as [-] hard-working, devout, [of] cultured and politically aware quarrymen, belonging to a whole community of like-minded people was a potent myth of the Welsh-Nonconformist-Radical tradition [-] in Prichard's novel the local pub seems more the focus of village life, and in place of the dignity and stoicism portrayed in the Roberts/Rowland Hughes world [-] here people crack and go under with the strain, commit suicide and go insane [-] religion is not an anchor, but an obsession, gossip and superstition, not political ideas are exchanged on the streets." Comparisons have been made with the world of  Dylan Thomas's Under Milk Wood.

In 2022, One Moonlit Night was included on the "Big Jubilee Read" list of 70 books by Commonwealth authors, selected to celebrate the Platinum Jubilee of Elizabeth II.

References 

Welsh novels
Welsh-language novels
1961 novels
Bethesda, Gwynedd
Novels set in Gwynedd